Budgong Sandstone is a lithic sedimentary rock occurring in the Sydney Basin in eastern Australia. This stratum is up to 370 metres thick. Formed in the Late Permian, it consists mostly of tuffaceous material from local Illawarra volcanic rocks. Budgong Sandstone is reddish brown to grey in colour. It creates soils which are associated with rainforest vegetation.

See also
 Sydney Basin
 Bald Hill Claystone
 Narrabeen group

References

Geologic formations of Australia
Permian System of Australia
Sandstone formations
Geology of New South Wales